Fudbalski klub Željezničar  (English: Football Club Željezničar) is a Bosnian professional football club based in Sarajevo, Bosnia and Herzegovina. The following article lists all the club seasons that the club has took part in.

SFR Yugoslavia (1946–1992)
Yugoslav League Seasons 1946–1992 references:

Top goalscorer; Name and Goals in bold indicate overall top league scorer for the season.
1  Željezničar were docked 6 points due to Planinić Affair
2  During season 1991–92 all of Željezničar's matches in the second half of the season were declared void due to Bosnian War resulting in Željezničar abandoning the competition as a result of Republic of Bosnia and Herzegovina declaring independence from Yugoslavia. The return leg of club's 1991–92 Yugoslav Cup semi-final tie was scheduled to be played on May 6, 1992; but due to Željezničar club leaving the competition earlier, Partizan were awarded the 3-0 win.

Željezničar competed next in 1994–95 season of First League of Bosnia and Herzegovina (see table below).

Key

P = Played
W = Games won
D = Games drawn
L = Games lost
F = Goals for
A = Goals against
Pts = Points
Pos = Final position

QR = Qualifying Round
1R = Round 1
2R = Round 2
R16 = Round of 16
QF = Quarter-finals
SF = Semi-finals
RUP = Runners-up
W  = Winners
None  = No participation

Bosnia and Herzegovina (1994–present)

 In seasons 2000–01 and 2011–12 the club won a double; national cup and league titles. Top goalscorer; Name and Goals in bold indicate overall top league scorer for the season.

See also

Premier League of Bosnia and Herzegovina
Super Cup of Bosnia and Herzegovina
First League of Bosnia and Herzegovina
Yugoslav First League

Notes

References

External links

Official website 
Official supporters' website 

seasons
 
Sport in Sarajevo